Rainer Pethran (26 November 1950 – 2 September 2019) was a West German basketball player. He competed in the men's tournament at the 1972 Summer Olympics.

References

External links
 

1950 births
2019 deaths
German men's basketball players
Olympic basketball players of West Germany
Basketball players at the 1972 Summer Olympics
Sportspeople from Augsburg